Richard Bernard Stone (September 22, 1928 – July 28, 2019) was an American politician who served as a Democratic United States Senator from Florida from 1975 to 1980 and later served as Ambassador at Large to Central America and Ambassador to Denmark.

Early life and career
Stone was born in New York City, the son of Lily (Abbey) and Alfred Stone, who was born in Belgium. His family was Jewish. He moved to Florida and attended public schools in Dade County.  Stone graduated cum laude with a B.A. from Harvard University in 1949 and received a LL.B. from Columbia Law School in 1954.  He returned to Florida and was admitted to the Florida Bar in 1955, practicing in Miami.

In 1966, Stone became Miami City Attorney and was elected to the Florida Senate in 1967, representing Dade County.  In 1970, he was elected Secretary of State of Florida. He resigned in July 1974, before his term ended, to focus on his campaign for the U.S. Senate.

Senate
In 1974, Stone ran in an 11-candidate Democratic primary election. Congressman Bill Gunter finished first but Stone won a close subsequent runoff, 51% to 49%. On the Republican side, incumbent Senator Edward Gurney chose not to run for re-election after being indicted for allegedly taking bribes in return for his influence with the Federal Housing Administration. Millionaire Eckerd drug store chain owner, Jack Eckerd, defeated Paula Hawkins for the Republican nomination.  In the general election, Stone narrowly defeated Eckerd in a race that saw the American Party candidate, John Grady, claim nearly 16% of the vote. Stone was the second Jewish U.S. Senator from Florida (after David Levy Yulee) and the first since the U.S. Civil War.  Outgoing Senator Gurney resigned on December 31, 1974 and Stone was officially appointed senator by Governor Reubin Askew on January 1, 1975, two days before his term was scheduled to begin.

During Stone's term in the U.S. Senate, he was a member of the Foreign Relations Committee and was a strong advocate for the Panama Canal Torrijos–Carter Treaties.  He also voted for neutron bomb funding, deregulation of natural gas, and public funding of congressional campaigns, and voted against an early version of the Kemp–Roth Tax Cut and funding medically necessary abortions. He led efforts to secure congressional aid for Israel and also served as an important advisor during the 1978 Camp David Peace Treaty. In addition to the Foreign Relations Committee, Stone served on the Agriculture Committee.

At the onset of his term, Stone was one of three Jewish members of the U.S. Senate along with Jacob Javits and Abraham Ribicoff.

Reelection bid
With a reputation for changing his mind and with the AFL–CIO actively campaigning against him, Stone was deemed vulnerable in his reelection bid. Six Democrats entered the race for Stone's seat including his 1974 runoff opponent Bill Gunter who was Florida State Treasurer/Insurance Commissioner in 1980. As was the case in 1974, Stone and Gunter were forced into a runoff but, unlike 1974, Gunter won the nomination in 1980. (Gunter was defeated by Paula Hawkins in the general election). Stone resigned three days early on December 31, 1980.

Post-senate
Senator Stone was included on President-elect Ronald Reagan's transition team the day after the 1980 elections. From 1981 to 1982, he was senior resident partner at the law firm of Proskauer, Rose, Goetz & Mendelsohn in Washington, D.C.  During that time, the Spanish-speaking Stone worked as a paid lobbyist for the right-wing Guatemalan government of Fernando Romeo Lucas García.  On January 19, 1982, Stone was named as Vice Chairman of the President's Commission for Radio Broadcasting to Cuba. He was also vice chairman of the board of Capital Bank of Washington. In February 1983, Stone served in the Department of State as Special Representative of the President for Public Diplomacy in Central America.

On April 28, 1983, President Reagan announced Stone's appointment as Ambassador at Large and Special Envoy to Central America.  Despite concerns over his recent ties with the oppressive right-wing Guatemalan government and how he would be perceived by the leftist FMLN of El Salvador, Stone was confirmed and commenced the position on May 26. Stone was once a paid lobbyist for the conservative Guatemalan government of Fernando Romeo Lucas Garcia. This made Democrats argue that he was ill-suited to be President Reagan's appointee to be Ambassador at Large for Central America, a role that required negotiation with the leftist government of El Salvador and other administrations. He resigned effective March 1, 1984, allegedly after experiencing personality conflicts with Assistant Secretary of State for Inter-American Affairs, Langhorne A. Motley. Stone continued working with Capital Bank and, in 1989, was named chief operating officer.  On November 9, 1991, he was nominated by President George H. W. Bush to be U.S. Ambassador to Denmark. The nomination was successful and Stone served from November 21, 1991 to October 14, 1993.

On December 28, 1995, Stone was appointed voting trustee for the discount drug store business, Dart Drug, which was owned by Herbert Haft and embroiled in a widely publicized family dispute. On September 24, 1997, Haft and Stone voted to appoint Stone as acting chief executive officer and, in February 1998, Stone was named chief executive officer.  By mid-1998, Dart Group was sold to Richfood.

Personal
Stone was married to Marlene Lois Stone and had three children and five grandchildren. He died on July 28, 2019 at a clinic in Rockville, Maryland from complications of pneumonia and other illnesses. At the time of his death, he resided in the Chevy Chase neighborhood of Maryland.

See also
List of U.S. political appointments that crossed party lines
List of Jewish members of the United States Congress

References

External links

United States Department of State: Ambassadors to Denmark
The Political Graveyard: Richard Bernard Stone

 

1928 births
2019 deaths
20th-century American politicians
Ambassadors of the United States to Denmark
American bankers
American chief operating officers
American prosecutors
Columbia Law School alumni
Democratic Party United States senators from Florida
Florida lawyers
Democratic Party Florida state senators
Harvard University alumni
Infectious disease deaths in Maryland
Jewish United States senators
Lawyers from New York City
Politicians from New York City
Proskauer Rose partners
Secretaries of State of Florida
United States Department of State officials
American people of Belgian-Jewish descent
20th-century American lawyers
21st-century American Jews